Francesco De Zanna (18 January 1905 – 9 April 1989) was an Italian bobsledder who competed in the 1930s. He competed in the four-man event at the 1936 Winter Olympics in Garmisch-Partenkirchen, but did not finish.

References
1936 bobsleigh four-man results
1936 Olympic Winter Games official report. - p. 415.

1905 births
1989 deaths
Italian male bobsledders
Olympic bobsledders of Italy
Bobsledders at the 1936 Winter Olympics